Philip Samuel "The Canonsburg Cannonball" Ahwesh (December 14, 1919 – February 5, 2004)
was an American football player and coach. He served as the head football coach at Duquesne University in 1949, compiling a record of 3–6. A successful athlete at Duquesne, Ahwesh was selected by the Washington Redskins in the 1942 NFL Draft.

Head coaching record

References

External links
 

1919 births
2004 deaths
American football halfbacks
Duquesne Dukes football coaches
Duquesne Dukes football players
High school football coaches in Pennsylvania
People from Canonsburg, Pennsylvania
Coaches of American football from Pennsylvania
Players of American football from Pennsylvania